The Palmerston North by-election of 1967 was a by-election for the electorate of Palmerston North on 2 December 1967 during the 35th New Zealand Parliament. The by-election resulted from the death of the sitting member Bill Brown of the National Party on 16 October 1967. Brown had held the seat since 1960, when he won it from Philip Skoglund of the Labour Party.

The by-election was won by Joe Walding of the Labour Party, and he held the seat for the next two elections, 1969 and 1972.

Results
The following table contains the election results:

References

Palmerston North 1967
1967 elections in New Zealand
December 1967 events in New Zealand
Politics of Manawatū-Whanganui